Zootoca is a genus of lizards of the family Lacertidae.

Species
Zootoca vivipara  — viviparous lizard
Zootoca carniolica

References

 
Lizard genera
Taxa named by Johann Georg Wagler